The 1964–65 season was the 81st football season in which Dumbarton competed at a Scottish national level, entering the Scottish Football League, the Scottish Cup and the Scottish League Cup.  In addition Dumbarton competed in the Stirlingshire Cup.

Scottish Second Division

Following a poor start to the league season, which saw only one win taken from the first five games, manager Jackie Fearn resigned, and by the time Willie Toner took over, the season was effectively over, as only another win and a draw had been taken from the subsequent seven matches.  An unbeaten run of 8 games in November/December brought some cheer, but in the end only 14th place could be achieved, with 32 points, 27 behind champions Stirling Albion.

Scottish League Cup

In the League Cup, Dumbarton were on the losing side only once in their sectional ties, but too many draws meant that once again qualification for the knock out stages was not achieved.

Scottish Cup

In the Scottish Cup, Dumbarton fell to a first round defeat against Queen's Park, after a draw.

Stirlingshire Cup
Locally however, Dumbarton were to regain the Stirlingshire Cup for the third time, with a fine aggregate win over Division 1 opponents Falkirk.

Friendlies

Player statistics

Squad 

|}

Source:

Transfers
Amongst those players joining and leaving the club were the following:

Players in

Players out 

Source:

References

Dumbarton F.C. seasons
Scottish football clubs 1964–65 season